Lizelle Muller, previously known as Lizelle van Niekerk (born 4 October 1984 in Port Elizabeth), is a South African professional squash player. As of October 2021, she was ranked number 124 in the world. She is the sister of Dewald van Niekerk, also a professional squash player.

References

1984 births
Living people
South African female squash players